Ectoedemia heringella is a moth of the family Nepticulidae. It is found in the Mediterranean Region, from southern France, Corsica, Sardinia, and Italy to Cyprus. It was first recorded from Great Britain in 2002.

The wingspan is 4.4–6 mm. Adults are on wing from late April to the end of June. There is one generation per year.

The larvae feed on Quercus alnifolia and Quercus ilex. They mine the leaves of their host plant. The mine consists of a strongly contorted gallery, almost entirely filled with black frass. There are often many mines in a single leaf.

External links
Fauna Europaea
bladmineerders.nl
A Taxonomic Revision Of The Western Palaearctic Species Of The Subgenera Zimmermannia Hering And Ectoedemia Busck s.str. (Lepidoptera, Nepticulidae), With Notes On Their Phylogeny

Nepticulidae
Moths of Europe
Moths described in 1939